Besleria elegans is a species of flowering plants in the family Gesneriaceae. It is found in Bolivia.

References

External links 
 Besleria elegans at The Plant List
 Besleria elegans at Tropicos

elegans
Plants described in 1818
Flora of Bolivia